This is a list of A-League Men honours achieved since the inaugural season of the league. The following details honours won by A-League Men clubs and those awarded to players, managers and referees of the competition.

Club honours

Premiers
The club that finishes first on the A-League Men table is crowned premiers.

Champions
The club that wins the A-League Men Grand Final in the finals series is crowned champions.

Summary

Fair Play Award
The Fair Play Award goes to the team with the fewest points on the fair play ladder at the conclusion of the regular season.

Individual honours

Johnny Warren Medal
The Johnny Warren Medal, named after the late former Socceroo and media advocate Johnny Warren, is presented to the player who is deemed to be the best player overall at the end of the season as judged by his fellow players. Each player in the A-League Men votes three times over the season; after Round 9, Round 18 and Round 27. Players are not allowed to vote for players from their own team. The format was changed for the 2015–16 season, with a panel featuring former players, media, referees and technical staff, who voted on each regular-season match.

Joe Marston Medal
The Joe Marston Medal is given to the best player in an A-League Men Grand Final. It is named after Joe Marston, an Australian national player in the 1950s.

Golden Boot

The Golden Boot is presented to the player who scores the most goals during the season. Only matches in the regular season are counted.

Coach of the Year

Young Footballer of the Year

The Young Footballer of the Year award is awarded to a youth (under 23) player judged by a panel of experts to be the best young performer throughout the season.

Goalkeeper of the Year

Goal of the Year

Referee of the Year

See also
 A-League all-time records
 A-League Pre-Season Challenge Cup

References

External links
RSSSF.com – Australia – List of Champions

A-League Men lists
A-League Men trophies and awards
A-League Men records and statistics